Bus transport in Central America is a major mode of transport and important in commerce in the area, as personal automobiles and rail transport are less common than in some wealthy nations.

The buses are often called by the Spanish terms "camioneta" or  "trambilla", the latter a hypercorrection of "tranvía".    The buses are sometimes modified and colorfully decorated. They transport goods and people between communities in various Latin American countries, especially Honduras, Guatemala, El Salvador, Nicaragua, Costa Rica and Panama. In the latter country, buses are also known as Diablos Rojos (lit. Red Devils).

The base vehicle is usually a retired North American school bus on a light or medium truck chassis. In Panama, the base vehicle can also be a passenger Toyota HiAce or Toyota Coaster or similar and is often left painted white. If a Toyota Coaster is used, the bus is known locally as a "Chiva", and if a Toyota HiAce is used, the van is called a "busito" instead.

"Chicken bus"
Some English speaking tourists call buses "chicken buses". The word "chicken" may refer to the fact that the buses are often crammed with passengers not unlike a truck load of chickens, or to the fact that Central Americans occasionally transport live animals on such buses–a practice that visitors from other countries often find remarkable.  The term "Chicken bus" is not used by locals, and some consider it offensive

Operation 

A typical bus features two young men who partner to operate the bus. One with a license takes the role the driver, while the other takes the role of ayudante or "helper" to customer service issues. The ayudante is responsible for passengers and luggage, collecting money, and organizing the suitcases, livestock, produce, etc. onto the roof of the bus–often while in motion. Loudly announcing destinations the bus is reaching is also a responsibility.

Some buses sport vibrant paint including the bus's name and permanent route. Religious imagery and verbiage is also common. Typically, bus operators seek to maximize profit by onboarding as many passengers as possible while driving to destinations at top speed. Some countries, such as Nicaragua, subsidize buses and establish maximum prices, which often end up being the de facto price for the route. Unlike most bus drivers in Europe, Central American bus operators are usually self-employed or members of cooperatives who use fares to cover expenses.

In Panama, these kind of buses are more commonly known as "Buses piratas" (pirate buses) since they are considered by the government to be illegal. There have been cases of buses piratas being operated without adequate driver's license. Some operators use smaller buses that don't require such a special or more expensive license. Smaller buses tend to be more fuel efficient which can increase profits considerably. These kind of buses were supposed to be phased out by 2012 and replaced by official "Metro Bus" transport.

However, buses piratas continue to operate in Panama due to popular demand after the official "Metro Bus" system suffered from negative perceptions of infrequent buses being too overcrowded during peak hours. These unofficial bus services have been declared illegal by the Panamanian government and the private import of North American-style buses was banned, yet efforts to stop this system of transport have nonetheless been met with little success.

See also 
 Chiva bus
 Jeepney
 Tap tap
Matatu

References

External links 

 Video, photographs, and a book about Guatemalan Chicken Buses
 Adventures on a chicken bus
 Videos of chicken bus travel

Bus transport in North America
Road transport in El Salvador
Road transport in Guatemala
Road transport in Honduras
Road transport in Nicaragua
Road transport in Panama
Road transport in Central America
Decorated vehicles